Locock is a surname. Notable people with the surname include:

Locock Baronets
Charles Locock (1799–1875), 1st Baronet, obstetrician to Queen Victoria
Charles Dealtry Locock (1862–1946), British literary scholar, editor, and translator

See also
Lowcock